Kondrobo is a town in central Ivory Coast. It is a sub-prefecture of Béoumi Department in Gbêkê Region, Vallée du Bandama District. The border with Woroba District is three kilometres northwest of town.

Kondrobo was a commune until March 2012, when it became one of 1126 communes nationwide that were abolished.

In 2014, the population of the sub-prefecture of Bodokro was 28,502.

Villages
The 34 villages of the sub-prefecture of Bodokro and their population in 2014 are:

Notes

Sub-prefectures of Gbêkê
Former communes of Ivory Coast